JCSAT-1 was a geostationary communications satellite designed and manufactured by Hughes (now Boeing) on the HS-393 satellite bus. It was originally ordered by Japan Communications Satellite Company (JCSAT), which later merged into the JSAT Corporation. It had a Ku-band payload and operated on the 150° East longitude until it was replaced by JCSAT-1B.

Satellite description 
The spacecraft was designed and manufactured by Hughes on the HS-393 satellite bus. With its solar panels fully extended it spanned . Its power system generated approximately 2350 watts of power thanks to two cylindrical solar panels. It also had a two 38 Ah NiH2 batteries. It would serve as the main satellite on the 150° East longitude position of the JSAT fleet.

It also used two axial and four radial  bipropellant thrusters for station keeping and attitude control. It included enough propellant for orbit circularization and 8 years of operation. Its payload is composed of a  antenna fed by thirty-two 27 MHz Ku-band transponders for a total bandwidth of 864 MHz. The Ku-band transponders had a Traveling-wave tube#Traveling-wave-tube amplifier (TWTA) output power of 20 watts.

History 
With the opening of the Japanese satellite communications market to private investment, Japan Communications Satellite Company (JCSAT) was founded in 1985. In June of the same year, JCSAT awarded an order to Hughes Space and Communications for two identical satellites, JCSAT-1 and JCSAT-2, based on the spin-stabilized HS-393 satellite bus. JCSAT-1 would become the first commercial Japanese communications satellite. It was successfully launched aboard an Ariane-44LP on 6 March 1989 at 23:29:00 UTC. Originally expected to be retired in 1997, it was finally sent to a graveyard orbit on 1998.

References 

Communications satellites in geostationary orbit
Communications satellites of Japan
Satellites of Japan
Spacecraft launched in 1989
Satellites using the HS-393 bus